Matthew Steven "Matt" Lineker (born 12 January 1985 in Derby, England) is an English cricketer, a left-handed batsman and slow left-arm orthodox bowler who played for Derbyshire; he is currently a free agent. He made his first-class debut for Derbyshire against Essex in August 2011. Lineker signed a summer contract with Derbyshire in 2010 for the 2011 season. Lineker had been a regular scorer in the Derbyshire Premier League before signing for Derbyshire.

County career
Lineker made his first-class debut against Essex on 23 August 2011. He opened the Derbyshire innings along with Martin Guptill and went for a fourteen-ball duck as Derbyshire made only 132 in the innings. In the second innings he performed slightly better hitting 16 runs from 39 balls in a drawn match at Chelmsford. He made his one-day cricket debut three days later against Kent. He made 13 runs from 23 balls opening with Chesney Hughes as Derbyshire chased 209 for victory. Derbyshire won the match by 3 wickets. He was released after just one season at Derbyshire.

Since then he has played for the Unicorns side in one-day cricket, scoring his maiden century in August 2013 against Yorkshire after notching his first half-century earlier in the season against Middlesex. He followed this up immediately with another century, this time going on to make 132 against Leicestershire at Leicester.

References

External links
 Matt Lineker Cricinfo Profile

Living people
English cricketers
Derbyshire cricketers
1985 births
Unicorns cricketers
Lincolnshire cricketers